Andrej "Jerry" Jerman, (born 30 September 1978), is a retired World Cup alpine ski racer from Slovenia.

Born in Tržič, then in SFR Yugoslavia, Jerman specialized in the speed events of downhill and super G. He gained his first World Cup victory at Garmisch-Partenkirchen in February 2007 in a downhill, the first-ever for Slovenia. The next day he finished second, again in the downhill. Until then, his best World Cup result was fourth place in a downhill at Bormio, two months earlier. Jerman later gathered his second victory at Bormio, and finished his career with four World Cup podiums, all in downhill, and 27 top tens, with 18 in downhill. His best result in Super G was fourth, which came at Lake Louise in November 2007.

Jerman represented Slovenia at three Winter Olympics and five World Championships. He announced his retirement from competition in late January 2013, following a crash during the Tuesday training run at Kitzbühel. After his fall, he got up and skied down, and then collapsed unconscious in the finish area. Jerman was transferred to the hospital by helicopter, where doctors diagnosed a severe concussion. He had missed most of the previous season after breaking his shin on the Birds of Prey course at Beaver Creek in early December 2011.

World Cup results

Race podiums
2 wins (2 DH)
4 podiums (4 DH)
27 top tens (18 DH, 4 SG, 1 SC, 4 K)

Season standings

^ official season title in the Combined discipline was not awarded until the 2007 season

Video
YouTube.com – Jerman falls at Val Gardena – 19 Dec 2009
YouTube.com – Jerman wins at Bormio – 29 Dec 2009
YouTube.com – Jerman breaks shin at Beaver Creek – 2 Dec 2011

References

External links
 
 Andrej Jerman World Cup standings at the International Ski Federation
 
 
 
 Andrej Jerman.com – personal website – 

1978 births
Living people
Slovenian male alpine skiers
Alpine skiers at the 2002 Winter Olympics
Alpine skiers at the 2006 Winter Olympics
Alpine skiers at the 2010 Winter Olympics
Olympic alpine skiers of Slovenia
People from Tržič